Isabella Tree, Lady Burrell (born 1964) is a British author and travel journalist. She is author of the Richard Jefferies Society Literature Award-winning book Wilding: the return of nature to a British farm that describes the creation of Knepp Wildland, the first large-scale rewilding project in lowland England. The  wildland project was created in the grounds of Knepp Castle, the ancestral home of her husband, Sir Charles Burrell, a landowner and conservationist.

Early life
Tree attended Millfield School.
She was adopted by an aristocratic British family as a baby. She read Classics at University, following the advice of author Iris Murdoch.

Career
From 1993 to 1995, Tree was, a travel correspondent at the Evening Standard. In 1999 she was Overall Winner of the Travelex Travel Writers’ Awards for a feature on Nepal's Kumaris, or 'Living Goddesses' -‘High and Mighty’- for the Sunday Times. As of 2016 she writes for the Sunday Times, Evening Standard, Observer, History Today and Condé Nast Traveller. Her work has also appeared in Reader's Digest Today's Best Non-Fiction, Rough Guides Women Travel and The Best American Travel Writing.

Personal life
She married Sir Charles Burrell and lives at Knepp Castle in West Sussex. Her father was the son of Ronald Tree and a member of a well connected Anglo-American family active in politics and public life on both sides of the Atlantic in the late 19th and first half of the 20th centuries.
She has two children, one of whom is called Nancy and researches rewilding at Oxford University.

Books

Awards
 2019: Shortlisted for Wainwright Prize (Wilding: the return of nature to a British farm)
 2018: Richard Jefferies Society Literature Award (Wilding: the return of nature to a British farm)
 2018: One of the top ten science books – Smithsonian Magazine (Wilding: the return of nature to a British farm) 
 Overall winner of the 1999 Travelex Travel Writer Awards
 "Spetses. Greece" was included in the series Best American Travel Writing
 Included work as part of the 1998 series Reader's Digest Today's Best Non-Fiction
 Shortlisted for the Thomas Cook Travel Book Award (Islands in the Clouds)
Awarded the CIEEM (Chartered Institute of Ecology and Environmental Management) Medal 2020
Awarded the Royal Geographical Society's Ness Award 2021

References

External links
IsabellaTree.com

1964 births
Living people
British travel writers
Wives of baronets
British adoptees
British women travel writers
People educated at Millfield